Thew may refer to:

Thew (surname), a medieval English surname
George Thew Burke (1776–1854), Canadian soldier, merchant and politician
Henry Thew Stevenson (1870–1957), American writer
Joshua Thew (born 1988), British ballet dancer
Julian Thew (born 1967), British poker player
Linda McCullough Thew (born 1918), British author
Daniel Thew Wright (1864–1943), American judge